Lion of Oz is a 2000 animated film set before the 1900 children's novel The Wonderful Wizard of Oz. It tells the story of how the Cowardly Lion, formerly part of the Omaha Circus, came to be in Oz and how he stopped the Wicked Witch of the East from getting the Flower of Oz. It is based upon the 1995 book Lion of Oz and the Badge of Courage by Roger S. Baum (great-grandson of L. Frank Baum, the original author of the Oz books).

Plot
A lonely lion is shown in a circus, where everyone is afraid of him apart from his friend, the eccentric and virtuous balloonist Oscar Diggs. One evening, Oscar Diggs takes Lion up on his balloon and gives him a Badge of Courage. A thunderstorm drags them to the Land of Oz and Lion falls from the balloon.

Lion comes across a living Oak Tree being harassed by flying monkeys. Lion frightens them off and the Tree thanks him. The Wicked Witch of the East appears, claiming that Oscar Diggs is her prisoner. She demands Lion find the Flower of Oz for her or he'll never see Diggs again. Tree explains to Lion that The Witch is bent on conquering Oz, but is prevented by the Flower.

Lion saves the fairy Starburst from drowning. Starburst and her friends tell Lion to go to a certain castle to find the Flower. Lion meets a springy teddy bear named Silly Oz-bul, who follows Lion to the castle, where they are confronted by a toy soldier named Captain Fitzgerald. They are joined by a young girl named Wimzik and her toy ballerina Caroline.

Finding out from Gloom about Lion's interference, the Witch teleports Fitzgerald to a dungeon. But while there, the captain learns from a flying monkey guard the Witch was lying about Diggs being her prisoner.

The friends come to a waterfall with a silver bridge to a floating island. Silly attempts to cross the bridge, which turns out to be an illusion. Lion saves him, from falling over the cliff and they come to the town of the Mini-Munchkins, who built the original Silver Bridge before it was destroyed by the Wicked Witch of the East. The bridge the group saw was just an illusion caused by the Mini-Munchkins' sadness and doubt. Wimzik inspires them to believe in themselves and not to give up, somehow breaking the Witch's spell over them and restoring the bridge.

Caroline's battery runs out just as the Witch returns and casts Caroline's unconscious body into a whirlpool. Lion and Wimzik save her. Wimzik's touch gives Lion extra strength and recharges Caroline.

Next, the group meets the Seamstress, an elderly enchantress who turns Silly and Caroline into quilt patches. Realizing the Seamstress is under the Witch's spell, Wimzik calmly talks her into remembering who she really is. The Seamstress gives them a petal she says came from the Flower of Oz. Lion gets a whiff and tracks it to a large garden encased in ice. When Wimzik touches the flower, the garden is instantly thawed and Lion realizes Wimzik is really the Flower of Oz.

The Witch and Gloom show up. Fitzgerald, having stowayed, reveals the Witch's deceit. A fight ensures. Lion takes the Witch's blast for Wimzik, nearly dying. But Wimzik sits on her throne, regaining her powers. Enraged, the Witch spitefully steals Lion's Badge of Courage and throws it to Gloom who destroys it. Wimzik defeats the Witch and destroys Gloom. Beaten, the Witch swears vengeance before vanishing.

Lion is sad to have lost his badge, but Wimzik explains his courage doesn't come from a badge, but from his brave and noble heart. Lion bids his friends goodbye as he must go find Oscar, but promises to come back someday.

The movie ends with Lion meeting Dorothy Gale, the Scarecrow, the Tin Man, and Toto, thus stepping out of his own story and into "The Wonderful Wizard of Oz".

Cast 
Henry Beckman as Narrator
Dom DeLuise as Oscar Diggs
Gerard Plunkett as The Oak Tree
Jason Priestley as Lion
Lynn Redgrave as The Wicked Witch of the East
Miklos Perlus as Sunbeam
Eleanor Noble as Moonbeam
Elizabeth Robertson as Starburst
Scott McNeil as Gloom
Bobcat Goldthwait as Silly Oz-Bul
Jane Horrocks as Wimzik
Tim Curry as Captain Fitzgerald
Kathy Griffin as Caroline
Peter Kelamis as Tog
Don Brown as Pin Cushion
Maxine Miller as Seamstress

Home media
The film was released onto Region 1 DVD in 2000 by Sony Wonder with special features on the disc including Sing Alongs, Music Videos (which were straight from the movie), Games, Interviews with Behind the Scenes and a Gallery. The film was later released onto Region 2 DVD in 2002 but had no special features and only a scene selection on the DVD menu.

Other animated Oz films/series 
The Wizard of Oz (1933)
Tales of the Wizard of Oz (1961)
Return to Oz (1964)
Journey Back to Oz (1972)
The Wizard of Oz (1982)
The Wonderful Wizard of Oz (1986)
Dorothy Meets Ozma of Oz (1987)
The Wizard of Oz (1990)
The Wonderful Galaxy of Oz (1992)
The Oz Kids (1996)
Tom and Jerry and the Wizard of Oz (2011)
Legends of Oz: Dorothy's Return (2013)
Guardians of Oz (2015)
Tom and Jerry: Back to Oz (2016)

References

External links

Animated films based on children's books
2000 films
Canadian animated feature films
Animated films based on The Wizard of Oz
Animated films about lions
British animated films
2000 animated films
English-language Canadian films
2000s American animated films
2000s English-language films
2000s Canadian films
2000s British films